South Beach is a neighborhood in Miami Beach, Florida, U.S.

South Beach may also refer to:

Places

South Africa
 South Beach, Durban

United States
 South Beach, San Francisco, California
 South Beach, Florida, in Indian River County
 South Beach, Staten Island, New York City
 South Beach station
 South Beach, Oregon
 South Beach State Park

Arts and entertainment
 South Beach (1993 TV series), an American action/adventure series
 South Beach (2006 TV series), an American drama series
 South Beach, a 2004 novel by Aimee Friedman
 "South Beach", a song by Ty Dolla Sign from the 2017 album Beach House 3

Other uses
 South Beach (nightclub), in Houston, Texas

See also 

 South Beaches, in Brevard County, Florida, U.S.
 South Beach Diet, a fad diet
 South Beach Tower, an integrated development in Singapore